Godsil is a surname, locational for a person from Gad's Hill. Notable people with the surname include:

Chris Godsil, Canadian mathematician

References

English toponymic surnames